In Greek mythology, Cerceis (Ancient Greek: Κερκηίς Kerkêis) was one of the Oceanids, daughters of the Titans of the Sea, Oceanus and Tethys. Her name means "of the weaving shuttle" from kerkis or "gorgeous in form". Thus, Cerceis was described as being lovely with a beautiful form.

Notes

References 

 Hesiod, Theogony from The Homeric Hymns and Homerica with an English Translation by Hugh G. Evelyn-White, Cambridge, MA.,Harvard University Press; London, William Heinemann Ltd. 1914. Online version at the Perseus Digital Library. Greek text available from the same website.

 Oceanids